"What Happens Tomorrow" is a song by British pop rock band Duran Duran from their 11th studio album, Astronaut (2004). It was released on 18 January 2005 as the second single from that album. The song debuted at number 11 in the UK Singles Chart on 6 February 2005 and was the second single from the album to peak at number two in Italy.

About the song
The track was originally debuted on an American Internet radio station in 2003 while the band were hunting around for a record deal. During the outro, bassist John Taylor announced that it would be a single later on in the year.

The version of "What Happens Tomorrow" played on the radio was an early demo featuring an extended bridge, which would be removed by the time the track was released on Astronaut; parts of the track were re-worked to become the B-side "Silent Icy River".

Music video
The video, which showed the band as constellations, was directed by the duo of Smith n' Borin (Frank Buff Borin and Ryan Smith). It was nominated on the Visual Effects Society Awards 2005 for "Outstanding Visual Effects in a Music Video" for media artists Jerry Steele, Jo Steele, Brian Adler and Monique Eissing. Playboy Playmate Nicole Marie Lenz and Steve Talley (American Pie Presents: The Naked Mile) appear in the video.

B-sides, bonus tracks and remixes
B-sides on various releases included "(Reach Up for The) Sunrise (Eric Prydz Mix)", "Silent Icy River", and "What Happens Tomorrow (Harry Peat Mix)".

Track listings
CD: Epic / 6756501 (UK)
 "What Happens Tomorrow" – 4:04
 "(Reach Up For The) Sunrise (Eric Prydz Edit)" – 3:36
 The full-length mix was released on a promotional 12 inch during the "Sunrise" campaign.

CD: Epic / 6756502 (UK)
 "What Happens Tomorrow" – 4:04
 "Silent Icy River" – 2:54
 "What Happens Tomorrow (Harry Peat Mix)" – 4:04
 "What Happens Tomorrow (video)" – 4:04

CD: Epic / 6756532 (International)
 "What Happens Tomorrow" – 4:04
 "Silent Icy River" – 2:54
 "What Happens Tomorrow (Harry Peat Mix)" – 4:04
 "(Reach Up For The) Sunrise (Eric Prydz Mix)" – 6:46

Personnel
 Simon Le Bon – vocals 
 Nick Rhodes – keyboards
 John Taylor – bass guitar
 Roger Taylor – drums
 Andy Taylor – guitar

Charts

Weekly charts

Year-end charts

Release history

References

2005 singles
Duran Duran songs
Songs written by Simon Le Bon
Songs written by Warren Cuccurullo
Songs written by Nick Rhodes